Overpass is a digital typeface, based on the FHWA Series Highway Gothic signage alphabets drawn for the United States Federal Highway Administration. It was designed by Delve Withrington with Dave Bailey and Thomas Jockin.

It was commissioned by the software company Red Hat as a freely usable replacement for Interstate, another Highway Gothic adaptation, which is used by Red Hat as its corporate typeface. Red Hat commissioned the family as a freely redistributable alternative since it does not own all rights to Interstate. 

Overpass currently is released with eight weights and obliques, as well as a monospaced font companion. Originally released in four weights, an expanded version was released in 2016.

In 2021 the font was rebuilt and improved by Aaron Bell and Michael Luton with new font weights and Cyrillic characters: latest release version: 4.0 (latest related release date: September 10, 2021).

See also
 IBM Plex - the open-source corporate font family of IBM

References

External links 
 Latest version: 4.0 (rebuilt and improved with new font weights and Cyrillic characters):
 Overpass Mono on Google Fonts
 
 Overpass on Google Fonts
 Previous version: 3.0.4 (without Cyrillic characters):
 Official website

Typefaces and fonts introduced in 2015
Sans-serif typefaces
Open-source typefaces
Corporate typefaces
Digital typefaces
Red Hat software

Monospaced typefaces